This is a list of cities worldwide by population density. The population, population density and land area for the cities listed are based on the entire city proper, the defined boundary or border of a city or the city limits of the city. The population density of the cities listed is based on the average number of people living per square kilometer or per square mile. This list does not refer to the population, population density or land area of the greater metropolitan area or urban area, nor particular districts in any of the cities listed.

Cities by population density

* indicates "List of cities in [country or [territory]" links.

See also

 List of largest cities
 List of world cities by population density
 List of city districts by population density
 List of countries and dependencies by population density
 List of European Union cities proper by population density
 List of United States cities by population density

References

External links
 The World's Densest Cities: Forbes 2007
 World's Densest Cities: Forbes 2006

City proper
Density